Ahuila Gencha Machay (possibly from Quechua awila grandmother a borrowing from Spanish abuela, qhincha bad luck, unlucky person, unlucky, qincha hedge, fence, mach'ay cave) is an archaeological site with cave paintings in Peru. It lies in the Huánuco Region, Huamalíes Province, Singa District.

See also 
 Quillcay Machay
 Huata

References 

Archaeological sites in Huánuco Region
Archaeological sites in Peru
Rock art in South America